Brown James Mpinganjira, popularly known as BJ is a Malawian Politician who used his 1986 detention to fight the injustices of the then one party state. He worked with others in prison and used their time to devise ways on how to change the direction of Malawi's political state. Mpinganjira was detained in 1986 and was released in 1991 due to international pressure. He began working for British council upon his release and received support from international community to form a pressure group and lobby for a referendum to decide whether Malawi was still to remain a one party state or become a multi party democracy. In the 1993 referendum, history was made at the polls when Malawians voted for multi party democracy.
In the first multi party elections, Mpinganjira contested as Member of Parliament in his home town Mulanje. He won the parliamentary seat in 1994 and served as an MP for Mulanje Central for 15years. In the 15 years that he was in parliament, Mpinganjira had a colourful political career and is one of the best political masterminds in Malawi. He has contested once as a presidential candidate for National Democratic Alliance (NDA) in 2004 and as a running mate in the Mgwirizano Coalition (MCP & UDF) in 2009.

Early life 
Brown James Mpinganjira was born on 7 November 1950 to Dr James Mpinganjira and his wife Ella Mankhokwe Mpinganjira, a nurse, in Mulanje district, Southern Region of Malawi. Brown is the first born in a family of 9 children. He did his primary education at Chisitu Primary School and proceeded to do his secondary school at Blantyre Secondary School. He then trained as a journalist in Cologne, Germany and attained his Masters Degree in Mass Journalism from University of Leicester, England.

Career 
Brown has worked at the state owned Malawi Broadcasting Corporation before becoming the Principle Information Officer in the Malawi Government Information Services Department in 1982. In 1985 he was promoted to Deputy Chief Information officer where he served for a year before being arrested and detained without charges.

Detainee 
BJ was detained under the Kamuzu Banda regime when he was the Deputy Chief Information Officer in 1986 and spent time at Mikuyu Prison in Zomba until his release in 1991. While in prison Mpinganjira, together with other detainees began operations by seeking international intervention to end the one party system. After his release in 1991, Mpinganjira started working for British council, which gave him the perfect cover for outside connections to continue the fight he had started while in prison. He co founded the then pressure group UDF and campaigned for a multi party democracy. He also had an underground newspaper that he titled "nkhani za ku Malawi" which he used to sensitise people on the issues of human rights violations going on in Malawi.

Political career 
In 1994, Dr Hastings Kamuzu Banda was defeated and Bakili Muluzi was elected as Malawi's 2nd president. Brown Mpinganjira was elected as Member of Parliament for Mulanje Central and served as a Minister during Bakili's tenure and was known as his right hand man. In May 1994 he was appointed as the Minister of Information, Broadcasting, Post & Telecommunications. His notable achievement during his time in this Ministry was the introduction of a Television station, private radio stations, commencement of cellular or mobile phone in Malawi and the onset of internet services. In July 1997 he was appointed as Minister of Education. In May 1999 after winning a second term as President of Malawi, Muluzi appointed Mpinganjira as Minister of Foreign Affairs Minister of Foreign Affairs of Malawi up until Jan 2000 when he was then appointed as Minister of Transport and Public Works. In October 2000, Muluzi dropped Mpinganjira from his cabinet and he was arrested on charges of corruption and that he had taken a $731 bribe to offer lucrative deals to his friends when he was Minister of Education. Mpinganjira dismissed the charges as being politically motivated. He said then, that he broke with Muluzi over the latter's attempt to have the constitution changed so that he could run for a third term of office. Mpinganjira was acquitted of all charges as there was no evidence to support the claims. Mpinganjira formed his own party, the National Democratic Alliance (NDA).The party was formed on to fight the third term bill that Muluzi wanted. Mpinganjira and others retaliated that was not the democracy that they fought for and would not allow Muluzi to become another "life president". In October 2001, Mpinganjira was arrested again, this time on charges of treason. These charges were again dropped due to lack of evidence in April 2002. The bill proposing to change the constitution amendment was defeated in July 2002. This is one of Mpinganjira's greatest win.

In the 2004 presidential election, the UDF candidate Bingu wa Mutharika won the elections and Mpinganjira's NDA was placed fourth, receiving only 8.7% of the vote. The party managed to contribute a number of Members of Parliament to the National Assembly among them Billy Kaunda and Mpinganjira himself. Mpinganjira later dissolved the NDA and rejoined the United Democratic Front, a party he helped to found. The party formally deregistered in August 2004.

In the May 2009 presidential election, Mpinganjira (on a UDF ticket) ran alongside Malawi Congress Party (MCP) presidential candidate John Tembo as Tembo's vice-presidential candidate. The MCP and the UDF both supported Tembo in the election. This time Mpinganjira not only lost the presidential race but he lost his seat as MP for Mulanje Central after serving for 15 consecutive years.

After the then vice president Joyce Banda fell out with President Bingu, she and others formed People's Party. Mpinganjira who had not been active on the political scene joined the part and served as Treasurer General of the party and vice president of the party. In April 2012, the president of Malawi Bingu wa Mutharika died, leaving Joyce Banda to take on the mantle as president. Mpinganjira was appointed to serve as Minister of Water Development and Irrigation in June 2013. In September 2013 he was then appointed as Minister of Information and Civic Education, a position he held until May 2014. In the 2004 general elections, Joyce Banda's candidature lost to DPP's Peter Mutharika. In May 2015, Mpinganjira resigned from the Peoples Party.

In January 2018, Mpinganjira was welcomed into the DPP party by President Peter Mutharika at a rally. In February 2018, he was appointed as board chairman of the National Roads Authority. In 2019, two of Mpinganjira's sons, Patrick Matola (Independent, Chiradzulu) and Chipiliro Mpinganjira (DPP, Blantryre Central) were elected as Members of Parliament.

References

1950 births
Living people
Foreign Ministers of Malawi
Malawian diplomats
National Democratic Alliance (Malawi) politicians
United Democratic Front (Malawi) politicians
Government ministers of Malawi